Esono is a surname. Notable people with the surname include:

Bartolomé Esono Asumu (born 1963),  Equatoguinean middle-distance runner
 Ivan Zarandona Esono
Juan Simeón Esono (born 1983) Equatoguinean former footballer
Justice Esono (born 1986), Equatoguinean footballer
Ramón Esono Ebalé (born 1977), Equatoguinean illustrator and comic artist